Communist League may refer to:

 Communist League, led by Karl Marx and Friedrich Engels
 Communist League (Austria)
 Communist League (Brazil)
 Communist League (Canada)
 Communist League (Denmark)
 League of Communists (Finland)
 Communist League (France)
 Communist League (Iceland)
 Communist League of India (Marxist–Leninist)
 Communist League (India, 1931)
 Communist League (India, 1934)
 Communist League (India, 1971)
 Communist League (Japan)
 Communist League of Luxemburg
 Communist League (Nepal)
 Communist League (New Zealand)
 League of Communists of Slovenia
 Communist League (Sweden)
 Communist League (West Germany)
 Communist League of West Germany
 League of Communists of Yugoslavia
 Communist League of America in the US

United Kingdom
 Communist League (UK, 1919), an anarchist communist group
 Communist League (UK, 1932), the first Trotskyist group in Britain
 Communist League (UK, 1988), part of the Pathfinder tendency
 Communist League (UK, 1990), a split from the Marxist Party
 Communist League of Great Britain, an anti-revisionist group formed in 1975

See also
 Communist Workers League (disambiguation)
 International Communist League (disambiguation)
 Revolutionary Communist League (disambiguation)
 Communist Party (disambiguation)
 Pathfinder tendency